John Bayne (23 November 1877 – 21 July 1915) was a Scottish footballer who played in the Southern League for Reading and Brentford as a centre forward. He also played in the Scottish League for Raith Rovers.

Personal life 
Bayne was married with three children. He enlisted in the British Army on 17 February 1896 and served as a private in the Black Watch during the Second Boer War. Between the end of his service and the outbreak of the First World War, Bayne worked in a mill in Dunblane. He was recalled to the Black Watch after the outbreak of the First World War in 1914 and was killed by a rifle grenade at Richebourg-Saint-Vaast on the Western Front on 21 July 1915. Bayne was buried in St Vaast Post Military Cemetery, Richebourg-l'Avoué.

Career statistics

References 

Scottish footballers
Scottish Football League players
British Army personnel of World War I
British military personnel killed in World War I
Heart of Midlothian F.C. players
1877 births
1915 deaths
Association football forwards
British Army personnel of the Second Boer War
Black Watch soldiers
Brentford F.C. players
Southern Football League players
Raith Rovers F.C. players
Sportspeople from Dunblane
Reading F.C. players
Deaths by hand grenade
Footballers from Stirling (council area)